John Frederick Hoffman (born August 2, 1943) is a former American football defensive end in the National Football League for the Washington Redskins, Chicago Bears, Denver Broncos, and the St. Louis Cardinals.  He played college football at the University of Hawaii and the University of Southern California. John is currently an attorney and a part-time county court magistrate in Denver.
John entered the U.S. Army upon graduation from High School in July 1961.  He attended Basic Training at Fort Ord, California followed by Advanced Individual Training as a 105 howitzer gun crew member at Fort Sill, Oklahoma.  He was then assigned to the Survey Platoon in Headquarters and Headquarters Battery, 82nd Airborne Division Artillery.  While with HHB John attended and graduated from one of the last Basic Airborne Classes (jump school) conducted at Fort Bragg.  While serving with the 82nd John made the Fort Bragg football team until he was recommended for the prestigious West Point Preparatory School at Fort Belvoir, Virginia.  John was also active in Lacrosse while at Fort Belvoir.
John attended West Point Prep. until his Army ETS (Expiration-Term of Service) in July 1964 after which he enrolled at USC.

References

1943 births
Living people
Players of American football from Santa Monica, California
American football defensive ends
Hawaii Rainbow Warriors football players
USC Trojans football players
Washington Redskins players
Chicago Bears players
Denver Broncos players
St. Louis Cardinals (football) players
American lawyers